Chersonesus is an ancient city near Sevastopol, Crimea.

Chersonesos or Chersonesus , the Greek word for "peninsula", may also refer to:

Cities
Cherronesos (Caria), an ancient city in Caria, now in Turkey
Chersonesus (northern Crete), an ancient city in northern Crete
Hersonissos, Crete, Greece, a village near the prior, adopting the ancient name
Chersonesus (western Crete), an ancient city in western Crete
Chersonesos (Sicily), an ancient Greek colony in Sicily, Italy
Chersonesos (Thrace), an ancient Greek colony, also called Agora, in what is today the Gallipoli peninsula
Chersonesus in Europa, an ancient city and bishopric in Turkish Thrace
Chersonesus Parva, a town in ancient Egypt

Peninsulas
Taurica or Chersonesus Taurica, today known as the Crimean Peninsula
Gallipoli, Turkey, called Chersonesus Thracica in antiquity
Jutland Peninsula, Denmark, called Chersonesus Cimbrica in antiquity
Malay Peninsula, Malaysia, identified with the Golden Chersonese, or the Chersonesus Aurea, in antiquity

See also

 
Chersonese (disambiguation)
Chersonesos A, a shipwreck off the coast of the Crimean peninsula
Chersonesus Cathedral, in Chersonesus, Crimea
Russian Orthodox Diocese of Chersonesus
Roman Catholic Diocese of Chersonesus (disambiguation)
Roman Catholic Archdiocese of Chersonesus in Zechia
Kherson (disambiguation)